Kak is a commune (khum) in Bar Kaev District in northeast Cambodia. It contains six villages and has a population of 1,729. In the 2007 commune council elections, all five of its seats were awarded to members of the Cambodian People's Party. Land alienation has been a major problem in Kak; the indigenous community now owns very little agricultural land. (See Ratanakiri Province for background information on land alienation.)

Villages

References

Communes of Ratanakiri province